Ángel David Revilla Lenoci (born 16 July 1982), better known as DrossRotzank or simply Dross, is a Venezuelan YouTuber and writer who resides in Buenos Aires, Argentina, since 2007.

Early life 
Ángel David Revilla Lenoci was born on 16 July 1982 in Caracas. His father was a pilot and his mother was a gastronomy-oriented businesswoman. His ancestry comes from Spain, Italy, and United States. He studied at Santa Maria University, and graduated from Social Communication in 2007 and also work as a journalist for a medical magazine.

In 1998 created the blog entitled El Diario de Dross (The Diary of Dross), whose username "Dross" originates due to a bad spelling of the name of the then wrestler Darren Drozdov, whom Revilla mistakenly refers to as «Warren Droz» in an interview with Radio Programas del Perú. Revilla started in 2000 writing scathing game reviews for websites like MeriStation or Vandal, he also made some posts in the forum GameFAQs.

Career

YouTube career

Revilla created his YouTube account, DrossRotzank in 2006, and in 2007, he moved to Buenos Aires, Argentina, where he currently resides. At first he was dedicated to uploading gameplays of different video games such as I Wanna Be the Guy. However, Dross had some videos that were older that in the end he deleted, among them is one that was re-uploaded by user Lucas Pedraza in which he calls a hacker.

In addition, he made some video reactions, videos answering questions and also some sketches with his characters like "El Troll", "La Gorda", "La Chica Pepsi", "Estela Conchaseca" and "Fuyito Kokoyama". His look consisted of wearing long hair, dark glasses and a straw hat with a leopard print.

In mid-2013, he turned his content to horror videos, and his most famous videos were the Top 7, which according to La Vanguardia, these videos "can take him twelve hours of work." In 2015, Dross participated in a project called "Dross Dark Tales of Terror", where he told contemporary horror stories. Revilla currently runs two additional YouTube channels: Los Vlogs de Dross (Dross's Vlogs), in which he deals with controversial issues, and Mi Querido Mussolini ("My Dear Mussolini"), in which he uploads videos of his pet fish, Mussolini.

In March 2017, Dross was invited to the "La Mole Comic Con" event, which took place at the World Trade Center in Mexico City and which was dedicated to pop culture and Japanese culture. He participated in three meet & greet sessions, on March 17, 18 and 19. Revilla traveled to the Horror Fest, held in the city of Monterrey, Mexico on October 6 and 7, 2018. In 2018 and 2019, he won in the Digital Artist and Digital Vision Award categories from Martín Fierro Awards. In 2020, he exceeded 20 million subscribers. At the beginning of 2021, Dross lent his voice to a Manjarate commercial for the Chilean company Soprole, distributed through the Internet and Chilean television channels. In December 2021, he won again in the category Best YouTuber of the Martín Fierro Awards.

Writing career
In 2015, he was invited to the YouTube Media Fest in Buenos Aires, where he stated during a question and answer session that "the biggest dream of my life is to publish a book." The people from the Planeta Group decided to speak with him to make and publish his first novel, Luna de Plutón (Pluto's Moon). It was released in Spain and Latin America in 2015, and it became one of the ten best-selling Argentine books in a few weeks. David reported in Clarín magazine that he "wrote this book with my real name, Angel Revilla, but I know that Luna de Pluton has drama, mystery, suspense, adventure, everything that Dross has. Above all the normal humor of my channel, black humor."

All his books from Luna de Plutón to Escape were published by Planeta Group. His second book, El Festival de la Blasfemia (The Festival of Blasphemy) was released in 2016, "a short story of terror, narrated from the black humor characteristic of Dross", a sequel to his first book, Luna de Plutón II: La guerra de Ysaak (Pluto's moon 2: The war of Ysaak), was released in March 2017.

His fourth book, El Valle de la Calma (The Valley of Calm) was published in 2018, a thriller based on H. P. Lovecraft works. In 2019, he released El libro negro. Deep web y horror cósmico (The black book. Deep web and cosmic horror), which explores the topics of the Deep Web and cosmic horror. It was the best-selling book in some countries of The Americas, like Argentina from August 25 to September 1, 2019. In September 2021, he wrote Escape, a book with a disturbing story and black humor.

Awards and nominations 
Martín Fierro Awards

Filmography

Works 
 (2015) Luna de Plutón. Planeta. .
 (2016) Festival de la blasfemia. Planeta. .
 (2017) Luna de Plutón II: La guerra de Ysaak. Planeta. .
 (2018) El Valle de la Calma. Planeta. .
 (2019) El libro negro. Deep web y horror cósmico. Planeta. .
 (2021) Escape. Planeta. .

References

External links 
 DrossRotzank at YouTube
 Los Vlogs de Dross
 Mi Querido Mussolini
 DrossRotzank at YouNow
 El Diario de Dross at Twitter

21st-century Venezuelan writers
1982 births
Argentine comedians
Argentine Internet celebrities
Argentine male writers
Argentine YouTubers
Live streamers
Living people
People from Caracas
Spanish-language YouTubers
Venezuelan comedians
Venezuelan emigrants to Argentina
Venezuelan Internet celebrities
Venezuelan male writers
Venezuelan people of Italian descent
Venezuelan YouTubers
YouTube channels
YouTube channels launched in 2006
YouTube streamers